Yanbian Television or Yanbian TV is China’s only Korean-language satellite TV media. It was officially launched on August 10, 2006.

History
On August 10, 2006, the Yanbian TV channel was formally launched, becoming China's first regional satellite television. Through Chinasat 6A and 9A, the coverage of the channel included China's Northeastern provinces and Shandong Peninsula, Beijing, Tianjin, and other ethnic Korean populated areas of China. Coverage also extended across countries in Asia, Europe and Oceania.

The actual implementation of Yanbian TV would be divided into three stages: the first stage was to complete effective coverage within China, the second stage to achieve coverage of the Korean-inhabited areas of Liaoning, Heilongjiang, and Inner Mongolia, and the third stage was to extend the coverage to the Southeast coastal areas of China where ethnic Korean groups live, and large cities such as Beijing and Shanghai.

Yanbian TV is the first domestic TV station to start from an autonomous prefecture. It has a unique significance to publicize Yanbian, and to allow outsiders to know and understand the region. At present, Yanbian TV has been broadcast on TV networks in more than 100 counties and in 25 regions across China. The viewership coverage has exceeded 100 million.

Advertising violations
On several occasions in November and December 2018, Yanbian TV faced multiple advertising violations, due to the channel broadcasting shopping and medical commercials overtime. The National Radio and Television Administration repeatedly instructed the Provincial Bureau of Jilin to urge Yanbian TV to rectify the issues. However, the channel's advertising violations have not been rectified in place and they have repeatedly continued to re-broadcast.

As a result, the National Radio and Television Administration ordered the Bureau of Radio and Television of Jilin Province to give Yanbian TV an administrative penalty by suspending the broadcast of commercial advertisements for 30 days.

Programs

References 

Television channels and stations established in 2006
Television networks in China
Mass media in Jilin
2006 establishments in China